The Reason Why is the fourth studio album by American country group Little Big Town. It was released on August 24, 2010, through Capitol Records Nashville. "Little White Church," which was released in March 2010 as the album's lead-off single, has since become a Top 10 hit on the U.S. Billboard Hot Country Songs chart.

Content
The album's title track was released as a digital single on July 27, 2010, to begin an iTunes countdown to the album release on August 24, 2010. Three further digital singles — "Kiss Goodbye," "Why, Oh Why," and "All the Way Down" — were released weekly leading up until the album release. "Little White Church," the album's first single release to radio, was a Top 10 on the Hot Country Songs charts, with a peak of number 6. "Rain on a Tin Roof," written by Chris Stapleton and Trent Willmon, previously appeared on Julie Roberts's 2004 self-titled debut album. "Kiss Goodbye" and the title track were released as the album's second and third singles, respectively; both reached a peak of number 42 on the Hot Country Songs chart.

Critical reception

The Reason Why received primarily positive reviews from music critics. Giving it four stars out of five, Jonathan Keefe of Slant Magazine thought that it was the band's most consistent album, praising the vocal harmonies as well as the cuts on which Karen Fairchild sang lead. He also thought that the band's sound was less derivative of Fleetwood Mac on this album than on previous works. Jessica Phillips of Country Weekly rated it three-and-a-half stars out of five, saying that the group had "renewed energy" on it, also highlighting Fairchild's lead vocals. Both Keefe and Phillips compared "Little White Church" favorably to Little Big Town's 2005 single "Boondocks." Thom Jurek of Allmusic also thought that the album showed a growth in sound over the band's two albums for Equity Music Group, giving it four stars out of five. Jim Malec of American Twang thought the group’s vocal arrangements were "overbearing and gimmicky," claiming that the album often "sounds like the soundtrack to a Broadway musical." However, he complimented the group member's individual voices, in particular Karen Fairchild's.

Track listing

Personnel

Little Big Town
 Karen Fairchild - vocals, tambourine
 Kimberly Schlapman - vocals, tambourine
 Phillip Sweet - vocals, piano
 Jimi Westbrook - vocals, acoustic guitar

Additional musicians
 J.T. Corenflos - 12-string electric guitar, electric guitar
 Steve Dale - bass guitar
 Dan Dugmore - pedal steel guitar
 Shannon Forrest - drums, tambourine
 Greg Hagan - electric guitar
 Jedd Hughes - acoustic guitar, electric guitar, mandolin
 Jay Joyce - electric guitar
 Gordon Kennedy - electric guitar
 Wayne Kirkpatrick - banjar, 12-string acoustic guitar, acoustic guitar, tenor guitar, hi-string guitar, national steel guitar, piano, shaker
 Phil Madeira - Hammond B-3 organ
 Chris McHugh - drums
 Jeffery Roach - keyboards
 Caleb Sherman - steel guitar
 Adam Shoenfeld - electric slide guitar, electric guitar
 Steve Sinatra - drums
 Jimmie Lee Sloas - bass guitar

Chart performance

Album
The Reason Why debuted at number 5 on the U.S. Billboard 200 and became their first number 1 record on the U.S. Billboard Country Albums charts, with first week sales of 41,939. As of the chart date January 8, 2011, the album has sold 150,298 copies in the U.S.

Weekly charts

Year-end charts

References

2010 albums
Capitol Records Nashville albums
Little Big Town albums